Fall Brook may refer to:

Fall Brook (Lackawanna River)
Fall Brook, Pennsylvania